Candelaria Pérez (1810 – 28 March 1870) was a Chilean soldier who served in the War of the Confederation (1836–39) against the Peru–Bolivian Confederation. She took up a rifle and fought alongside the troops she served with. She was considered the hero of the Battle of Yungay, during which she led an assault against the entrenched Confederate troops. She was given official recognition and the rank of sergeant after the battle.

She was made a commissioned officer before she left the army in 1840, with the rank of Alférez (translated as ensign).

References 

1810 births
1870 deaths
Chilean Army officers
Chilean Army enlisted personnel
Chilean women
People of the War of the Confederation
People from Santiago
Women in 19th-century warfare
Women in war in South America
19th-century Chilean military personnel